Northside station is a station on the Metrorail rapid transit service in Gladeview, Florida. This station is located near the intersection of 79th Street (SR 934) and Northwest 31st Avenue, opening to service May 19, 1985.

Station layout

Places of interest
Northside Shopping Plaza
Flea Market USA
Walmart supercenter
Ross Dress for Less
West Little River

References

External links
MDT – Metrorail Stations
 Station from Google Maps Street View

Green Line (Metrorail)
Metrorail (Miami-Dade County) stations in Miami-Dade County, Florida
Railway stations in the United States opened in 1985
1985 establishments in Florida